Algernon Henry Moreing (30 September 1889 – 22 October 1974) was a British politician who served as Member of Parliament for Buckrose 1918–22, and Camborne 1922-23 and 1924–29.

Early life

Moreing was born in September 1889, in London, England, to Helena (born in the North West Province of India) and Charles Algernon Moreing, a civil and mining engineer originally from New South Wales, Australia (1911 Census, England). He was educated at Winchester School and Trinity College, Cambridge. He became a partner, as did his brother Adrian Charles Moreing (also an MP), in his father's mining engineers firm, Messrs Berwick, Moreing & Co.

World War I

Early in the war he was commissioned into the 283rd (London) Brigade, Royal Field Artillery (RFA), Territorial Force, and saw active service with the British Expeditionary Force in France with its Ammunition Column; on 20 June 1916 he was appointed Officer Commanding of No.3 Section, 56th (London) Divisional Ammunition Column. He was discharged from the RFA at the end of his military career with the rank of captain. (Medal Index Card, & 56th Div. Ammo Col War Diary WO/95/2941 at The National Archive, Kew, Surrey).

Political career

Moreing was first elected to Parliament in 1918 as the MP for Buckrose in Yorkshire, switching to contest Camborne in Cornwall in 1922. He was a Liberal who supported the Coalition government led by Lloyd George. At the 1923 general election, following Liberal unification, he stood as the official Liberal candidate. However, he lost his seat to an Independent Liberal candidate, Leif Jones. After that election concluded, he supported Winston Churchill's efforts to revive the Conservative/Liberal coalition. He fought the 1924 general election as a Constitutionalist and regained his seat from Leif Jones. After the 1924 election, he took the Conservative whip. In 1929, standing as a Conservative, he lost the Camborne seat again to Jones.

Death

He died in Suffolk, England, in October 1974 aged 85.

References

External links 

1889 births
1974 deaths
Conservative Party (UK) MPs for English constituencies
UK MPs 1918–1922
UK MPs 1922–1923
UK MPs 1924–1929
Members of the Parliament of the United Kingdom for Camborne
Liberal Party (UK) parliamentary candidates
National Liberal Party (UK, 1922) politicians